The following is a list of Eastern Michigan Eagles men's basketball head coaches. There have been 30 head coaches of the Eagles in their 126-season history.

Eastern Michigan's current head coach is Stan Heath. He was hired as the Eagles' head coach in April 2021, replacing Rob Murphy, who mutually parted ways with Eastern Michigan after the 2020–21 season.

References

Eastern Michigan

Eastern Michigan Eagles basketball, men's, coaches